Palorini is a tribe of darkling beetles in the family Tenebrionidae. There are about 12 genera in Palorini.

Genera
These genera belong to the tribe Palorini:

 Astalbus Fairmaire, 1900  (tropical Africa)
 Austropalorus Halstead, 1967  (Australasia)
 Eutermicola Lea, 1916  (Australasia)
 Palorinus Blair, 1930  (Indomalaya and Australasia)
 Paloropsis Masumoto & Grimm, 2004  (Indomalaya)
 Palorus Mulsant, 1854  (North America, the Palearctic, Indomalaya, Australasia, and Oceania)
 Platycotylus Olliff, 1883  (tropical Africa, Indomalaya, and Australasia)
 Prolabrus Fairmaire, 1897  (tropical Africa)
 Pseudeba Blackburn, 1903  (Australasia)
 Ulomina Baudi di Selve, 1876  (North America, the Palearctic, Indomalaya, Australasia, and Oceania)
 Ulomotypus Broun, 1886  (Australasia)
 † Vabole Alekseev & Nabozhenko, 2015

References

Further reading

 
 

Tenebrionoidea